Clando is a 1996 drama film from Cameroon directed by Jean-Marie Teno. Initially set in Douala, the film explores the experiences of Anatole Sobgui (played by Paulin Fodouop), a man who loses his job as a computer programmer and begins working as an unlicensed cab driver (or 'clando') who is arrested and tortured by a corrupt regime for printing anti-government leaflets. Left sexually and psychologically impotent by the experience, his life begins to deteriorate rapidly.  He migrates to Cologne to find his former employer's son, Chamba. Here, he falls in love with a local, a political activist named Irene, who convinces him to return home to Cameroon.

Clando was Teno's first feature-length film.  It addresses issues around migration and political violence in Cameroon, and sharply criticizes the authoritarian leadership.

Cast

Anatole Sobgui - Paulin Fodouop
Madeleine Sobgui - Henriette Fenda
Irene - Caroline Redl
Chamba Rigobert - Joseph Momo
Tchobe	- Guillaume Nana

References

See also

1996 films
Cameroonian drama films
1990s French-language films
Works about human migration
1996 drama films